Dudi Sela was the defending champion but chose to participate at the 2013 US Open instead.
Top seed Blaž Kavčič won the title over surprise finalist Jeong Suk-Young 6–3, 6–1.

Seeds

Draw

Finals

Top half

Bottom half

References
 Main Draw
 Qualifying Draw

Singles
Chang-Sat Bangkok Open - Singles
 in Thai tennis